Sybra strandi is a species of beetle in the family Cerambycidae. It was described by Stephan von Breuning in 1939.

It's 6.5–8 mm long and 2–2.25 mm wide, and its type locality is Madurai, India. It was named in honor of Embrik Strand, in whose Festschrift the species description was written.

References

strandi
Beetles described in 1939
Taxa named by Stephan von Breuning (entomologist)